Jacobsohn is a surname. Notable people with the surname include:

Boris Jacobsohn (1918–1966), American physicist
Dora Jacobsohn (1908–1983), German-Swedish physiologist and endocrinologist
Friedrich Jacobsohn (born 1894), German urologist and writer
Helen Jacobsohn (born 1945), Australian sprint canoeist
Margaret Jacobsohn, Namibian environmentalist
Siegfried Jacobsohn (1881–1926), German writer and journalist
Simon E. Jacobsohn (1839–1902), Latvian-American violinist

See also 
Bekhterev–Jacobsohn reflex, Medical sign